Nicholas Opolski is an Australian actor, who is best known for his role as Evan Hancock on the Australian soap opera Neighbours in 2001–2002. He has also provided the voice of B2, one of the characters in the children's television show Bananas in Pyjamas for the ABC. He also worked as a presenter on another ABC Kids show Play School since 1992–1994. His hobbies are reading biographies, swimming, traveling and playing tennis.

Filmography
 I Can't Get Started (1985 film)(1985)
For Love Alone (1986)
 The Facts of Life Down Under (TV movie 1987)
A Country Practice (TV series 1991)
Bananas in Pyjamas (TV series 1992)
G.P. (TV series 1993)
 13 Gantry Row (TV movie 1998)
Water Rats (TV series 1998)
BackBerner (TV series 2001)
Neighbours (TV series 2000-2002)
Blue Heelers (TV series 2002)
MDA (TV series 2003)
Stingers (TV series 2004)
Curtin (TV movie 2007)
Satisfaction (TV series 2007)

References

External links

Living people
Australian male soap opera actors
Australian people of Polish descent
Australian children's television presenters
1963 births